Andrew Watson (born 1894) was a Scottish professional footballer who played as a right back.

Career
Born in Kirkcaldy, Watson spent his early career with Kirkcaldy United and Bolton Wanderers. He signed for Bradford City in July 1922, making 7 league appearances for the club before being released in 1923.

Sources

References

1894 births
Date of death missing
Scottish footballers
Kirkcaldy United F.C. players
Bolton Wanderers F.C. players
Bradford City A.F.C. players
English Football League players
Association football fullbacks